Shum may refer to:

Surnames 
 Shum (surname), a surname in various cultures (including a list of people with the name)
 Cen (surname) (岑), sometimes romanized Shum in Cantonese
 Shen (surname) (沈), sometimes romanized Shum in Cantonese

Places 
Shum (location), a town in Pakistan
Shum Laka, most prominent site in the Laka Valley of northwest Cameroon
Shum-gora, burial mound in northwestern Russia

Music 
 "Shum" (song), 2021 song by Go_A

Politics 
Takkanot Shum, set of decrees formulated and agreed by three central cities of medieval Rhineland
 Wagshum or shum, the governor of the province of Wag, with hereditary title from Zagwe dynasty; see Ethiopian aristocratic and court titles